Searching for Closure may refer to:

 "Searching for Closure", a song by Farrah Abraham from My Teenage Dream Ended
 "Searching for Closure", a photograph collection of Perućac lake